Soldier Boy is a 2019 Russian-language film. It is based on the real-life story of the youngest soldier in World War II, Sergei Aleshkov,  who was only 6 years old.

Synopsis 
The film is based on true story of a six-year-old boy who became a Soviet war hero during World War II. The film shows the struggle of war and the horrific scenes the boy witnessed during the war. Sergei (Seryozha) Aleshkov loses his family, and the last remaining member of his family (his aunt) is captured by the Germans. Sergei is then rescued by an army regiment 142nd Guards Rifle Regiment of the 47th Guards Rifle Division). He is adopted by the unit commander, Commander Kutzenov, and becomes the youngest member of a regiment in WWII.  In addition to being beloved by the soldiers of the unit, he distinguishes himself with numerous heroic acts, for which he earns the Medal "For Battle Merit" on April 26, 1943.

Cast
 Andrey Andreev as Sergei Aleshkov
 Viktor Dobronravov as Commander Kuznetsov (Nikolai Sergeevich Kutzenov) 
 Daria Ursulyak as nurse Katya
 Andrey Novik as scout Andrey

References

External links

2019 films
Russian war drama films
2019 war drama films
World War II films based on actual events
Russian World War II films